Mathematics of Control, Signals, and Systems is a peer-reviewed scientific journal that covers research concerned with mathematically rigorous system theoretic aspects of control and signal processing. The journal was founded by Eduardo Sontag and Bradley Dickinson in 1988.  The editors-in-chief are Lars Gruene, Eduardo Sontag, and Jan H. van Schuppen.

Abstracting and indexing 
The journal is abstracted and indexed in Digital Mathematics Registry, Mathematical Reviews, Science Citation Index, Scopus, VINITI Database RAS, and Zentralblatt Math. The journal is abstracted and indexed in Digital Mathematics Registry, Mathematical Reviews, Science Citation Index, Scopus, VINITI Database RAS, and Zentralblatt Math. The journal has a 2019 impact factor of 0.976 (2019)

References

External links 
 

Publications established in 1988
Mathematics journals
Springer Science+Business Media academic journals
English-language journals
Quarterly journals